Johanna Warren is an American musician and actor. To date she has released six solo albums. Rolling Stone Magazine has called her a "Singer-Songwriter You Need to Know."

Early life
Warren was born in St. Petersburg, Florida. She studied classical flute as a child, and started teaching herself guitar at age thirteen. In college Warren formed indie psych folk band Sticklips. The group released two LPs before disbanding in 2012.

Career 
Warren self-released her first solo record, Fates, in 2013. Her sophomore solo LP, numun, released in 2015 on Team Love Records, made its way on to several year-end lists, including Stereogum's Best New Bands of 2015. 

In 2016 Warren founded Spirit House Records, on which she released her third solo album Gemini I and its conceptual "twin" Gemini II, which received praise from The New York Times, Pitchfork and NPR.

Warren has been touring extensively since 2012. She has toured with Mitski, Julie Byrne, Marissa Nadler, and Xasthur. She was an official performer at SXSW in 2017 and 2018.

On May 1, 2020 Warren's fifth studio album Chaotic Good was released on Carpark Records/Wax Nine Records. It received praise from Pitchfork, NPR, and Paste Magazine.  

Warren is also active as an actor. She played the supporting lead in indie feature film She the Creator (post-production), the debut from writer/director Juliette Wallace. She voiced the character Bob on the Netflix series The Midnight Gospel. The music video for her single "Twisted," which Warren starred in and co-directed with Richey Beckett, won Best Music Video at the Portland Film Festival. 

In October, 2021 Warren announced her new musical adaptation of Euripides' The Bacchae, co-written with fellow interdisciplinary artist J Landon Marcus. A first look at the production was premiered online via Harvard's Center for Hellenic Studies.  

Also an herbalist and Reiki Master, Warren is an outspoken advocate for regenerative farming, rewilding and the healing powers of nature. In 2018 Warren traveled solo around the US on a "Plant Medicine Tour," partnering with local herbalists and organic farmers in over 65 cities to raise awareness about the healing powers of plants.

Discography

Solo albums 
 It is Like a Horse. It is Not like Two Foxes (2009) – as Sticklips
 Zemi (2012) – as Sticklips
 Fates (2013)
 numun (2015)
 Gemini I (2016)
 Gemini II (2018)
 Chaotic Good (2020)
 Lessons for Mutants (2022)

Guest appearances  
 Natalie Merchant album by Natalie Merchant (2014) – Backing vocals on multiple songs
 Not Even Happiness album by Julie Byrne (2017) – Backing vocals on multiple songs
Zoolights album by Forest Veil (2016) – Backing vocals and flute on multiple songs

Filmography

FILM

TV

References 

Year of birth missing (living people)
Living people
Musicians from Portland, Oregon
American women singer-songwriters
American singer-songwriters
21st-century American women
Musicians from St. Petersburg, Florida